I Wanna Date a Race Car Driver was a reality television show on Speed Channel. hosted by Scott Lasky, the format was similar to ABC's The Bachelor, although contestants competed for dates with racing stars, like NASCAR Craftsman Truck Series driver Jon Wood, and not for their hand in marriage. The show, which debuted in June 2004, was immediately panned by the network's viewers, who complained that the Fox Network-owned channel was sinking to a low level by caving into the reality dating shows that are so popular in the present day.

The show disappeared from SPEED's lineup in late Summer of 2004, never to return.

American dating and relationship reality television series
Speed (TV network) original programming
2000s American reality television series
2004 American television series debuts
2004 American television series endings